Hartz Mountain or Hartz Mountains can refer to one of:

 Hartz Mountains (Nunavut), a mountain range on Baffin Island, Nunavut, Canada
 Hartz Mountains (Tasmania), twin mountains in Tasmania, Australia
 Harz, a mountain range in northern Germany
 Hartz Mountain Industries, American real estate company
 Hartz Mountain Corporation, American pet food company